Grace Margaret Perkins (August 20, 1900 - December 16, 1955; sometimes credited as Dora Macy) was an American screenwriter, actress, and novelist active during the 1920s through the 1950s.

Early life
Perkins's father was publisher James Lamont Perkins. She was the sister of musician Ray Perkins and actress Bobbie Perkins. Born in Boston, Perkins grew up in New York City and Westchester. She attended a Sacred Heart Catholic girl's school in Manhattan and, for one year, a boarding school. Her studies at Columbia University's School of Journalism ended with her father's death during her sophomore year.

Career
After Perkins left Columbia, she studied stenography and worked with a magazine until Minnie Dupree encouraged her to try acting after they had worked together on entertainment for soldiers. Leaving the magazine, she went to Toronto, where she acted in a stock theater company, after which she performed in Rochester. Eventually, she left acting and became a newspaper reporter. Her first assignment, interviewing a woman whose husband had been murdered, turned her from covering hard news to writing book reviews and bedtime stories. Apart from that work for the newspaper, she wrote songs for children and serials and short stories for magazines. 

On Broadway, Perkins portrayed Rosalie in The Lullaby (1923) and Miss Larrier in Her Way Out (1924).

She wrote the magazine article No More Orchids, which was the basis for the 1932 film of the same title.<ref>{{cite news |title='No More Orchids is sparklingly modern |url=https://www.newspapers.com/clip/70483125/shamokin-news-dispatch/ |access-date=February 14, 2021 |work=Shamokin News-Dispatch |date=January 4, 1933 |location=Pennsylvania, Shamokin |page=5|via = Newspapers.com}}</ref> She and Oursler wrote the play The Walking Gentleman (1942).

Perkins was executive editor of a monthly magazine, Guideposts, in Carmel, N.Y..

Dora Macy
Dora Macy occurs as a character name in fiction, including Perkins'.

Personal life

Perkins was the second wife of writer Fulton Oursler, with whom she had two children. On his death, Oursler left his estate to Perkins on the understanding that she would leave the estate to his four children. When she died, she only left it to the two children she had with Oursler. Oursler's elder two children successfully sued for their share.

She died in New York City in 1955, aged 55.

 Selected works 
 Air Hostess 1919
 Mike 1933
 
 Ex-Mistress
 Night Nurse
 Promiscuous
 Public Sweetheart No. 1
 Riding High
 No More Orchids
 The Unbreakable Mrs Doll
 Modern Lady
 Twilight Cheats
 Crazy Kid

 Selected filmography 

 Three on a Honeymoon (1934)
 Social Register (1934)
 Torch Singer (1933)
 Air Hostess (1933) (uncredited)
 No More Orchids (1932)
 Personal Maid (1931)
 Night Nurse (1931)
 My Past'' (1931)

References 

American women screenwriters
Screenwriters from Massachusetts
1900 births
1955 deaths
20th-century American women writers
20th-century American screenwriters